Scouse is a type of stew typically made from chunks of meat, usually beef or lamb, with potatoes, carrots and onion. It is particularly associated with the port of Liverpool, which is why the inhabitants of that city are often referred to as "scousers".
The word comes from lobscouse, a stew commonly eaten by sailors throughout northern Europe in the past, and surviving in different forms there today.

Description
Scouse is particularly associated with the port of Liverpool. The recipe for scouse is fairly broad, it was traditionally made from leftovers and whatever was in season at the time. Guardian food writer Felicity Cloake describes scouse as being similar to Irish stew, or Lancashire hotpot, though generally using beef rather than lamb as the meat. While ingredients can vary, those essential are potatoes, carrots, onion and chunks of meat, with beef favoured over lamb. These are simmered together for several hours. The meat may be seared first, then reserved while some of the potatoes are boiled; as they break up, thickening the mix, the meat and the rest of the potatoes are added, and the stew finished off.

A survey by The Liverpool Echo in 2018 confirmed that for the majority of cooks the basic ingredients are potatoes, carrots, onion and chunks of meat, though many advocated the addition of a stock cube, and a few also added other ingredients, such as peas, lentils or sweet potato, and herbs including rosemary, parsley and basil. The choice of meat varied: some cooks did not stipulate a particular meat; among those who did, beef was chosen rather than lamb by a majority of nearly two to one.

While purists argue that anything other than beef, potatoes, carrots, onion is not scouse, others point out that, as a thrift dish, it will contain 'whatever veg you had... and...the cheapest cuts of meat'. Some recipes suggest including marrowbones to thicken the stew. Proportions vary from equal amounts of meat and vegetables to a 1:5 proportion between meat and potato. A meatless version, known as "blind scouse", is also recorded, for vegetarians, or when people were too poor to afford meat. Scouse is generally served with pickled red cabbage or beetroot, and crusty bread.

Origin 
Scouse is strongly associated with the port of Liverpool and its hinterland, in the north-west of England. Other parts of the country were slower to begin growing potatoes, but they were cultivated in Lancashire from the late 17th century onwards. By the late 18th century the potato-based lobscouse – by then also known simply as scouse – had become a traditional dish of the region. A 1797 description records that potatoes were "peeled, or rather scraped, raw; chopped, and boiled together with a small quantity of meat cut into very small pieces. The whole of this mixture is then formed into a hash, with pepper, salt, onions, etc., and forms a cheap and nutritive dish".  However, an earlier reference from 1785 reads, "LOBS-COUSE, a dish much eaten at sea, composed of salt beef,[ship's] biscuit, and onions, well peppered and stewed together."  Liverpool being a seaport would explain how the dish, "much eaten at sea", became a favourite in that city.

In the poorest areas of Liverpool, when funds ran too low for the purchase of even the cheapest cuts of meat, "blind scouse" would be made, using only vegetables.

The Oxford English Dictionary (OED) states that "scouse" is a shortened form of "lobscouse" a sailors dish from the 18th century. According to The Oxford Companion to Food, lobscouse "almost certainly has its origins in the Baltic ports, especially those of Germany", although it offers no evidence to support this assertion. The claim is repeated in a number of sources, though again, no reason given for this belief. Contrariwise Crowley points out that lobscouse (as "lobs course") is mentioned by Smollett in 1750, while Kluge dates its first appearance in German in 1878, and concludes the usage spread from Britain to northern Europe rather than vice versa.

Similar dishes are traditional in countries around the North Sea, such as Norway (lapskaus), Sweden (lapskojs), Finland (lapskoussi), Denmark, (skipperlabskovs), and northern Germany (Labskaus). though these differ from the original lobscouse, and from each other. Swedish Lapskojs and Norwegian Lapskaus is a stew, like scouse, while German Labskaus is a form of hash. However, lobscouse is also different from scouse, being a type of gruel. Nineteenth-century sailors made lobscouse by boiling salted meat, onions, and pepper, with ship's biscuit used to thicken the dish.

Origin of name
According to the Oxford English Dictionary (OED), "scouse" is a shortened form of "lobscouse" and has also been written as "lopscourse", "lobscourse", "lobskous", "lobscouce", and "lap's course". Its oldest quote is from 1707, by the satirist Edward Ward: "He has sent the Fellow ... to the Devil, that first invented Lobscouse."

The first known use of the term "lobscouse" is dated 1706, according to Webster's Dictionary. Tobias Smollett refers to "lob's course" in 1750. The roots of the word are unknown. The OED states that the origin is unknown, and goes on to compare the word to loblolly, which means a "thick gruel or spoon-meat, frequently referred to as a rustic or nautical dish or simple medicinal remedy; burgoo" and "perhaps [is] onomatopoeic: compare the dialectal lob 'to bubble while in process of boiling, said esp. of porridge', also 'to eat or drink up noisily'".

Friedrich Kluge also states that the origin of lobscouse is unknown, and that it was loaned to German in the 19th century where it was called labskaus. Hjalmar Falk and Alf Torp states that lobscous originally was lob's course from a lob (a lump) and course (a dish) and that the word has travelled to Norwegian as labskaus and Danish as lobskous.

The similarities with labs kauss in Latvian and labas kaušas in Lithuanian is called gobbledygook (Kauderwelsch) of the mind in Der Spiegel by Petra Foede. Foede translates Labs kausis to means a "good plate" in Latvian, and says that in Lithuanian they use labas káuszas for a "good plate". According to Gerhard Bauer káuszas in Lithuanian means a wooden ladle or dipper or a wooden drinking bowl and is the same word as Lettish kauśis and this Baltic word has been adopted in German as Kausche or Kauszel which means wooden jug, pitcher or drinking bowl.

Reich does not cite any sources to his claim.

By the end of the 18th century the term "lobscouse" had been shortened to "scouse" in Liverpudlian usage. In his book The State of the Poor: or a History of the Labouring Classes in England (1797) Sir Frederick Eden cites a report from the early 1790s listing expenditure on food in the Liverpool poorhouse. It included: "Beef, 101 lbs. [46 kg] for scouse … 14 Measures potatoes for scouse []; and Onions for ditto []".

Global Scouse Day
In 2008 the first "Global Scouse Day" was organised, and at 2020 continues, as an annual event every 28 February. Bars, cafes and restaurants in Liverpool and around the world put scouse on the menu for the day, raising funds for charities.

Variations
Lobscouse is also remembered in other parts of the north-west. In the Potteries, a similar stew is known as "lobby",
and people from Leigh, Greater Manchester, are known as "lobby-gobblers".
In North Wales the full form is retained as "lobscaws" (Welsh: lapsgóws)

A version of scouse has been known on the Atlantic coast of Canada in Newfoundland and Labrador, from at least 1792. It is described as a sea dish of minced and salted beef, crumbled sea biscuit, potatoes and onions.

See also

 Cawl
 List of lamb dishes
 List of stews
 Scotch broth
 Stovies
 Kaldereta

Notes, references and sources

Notes

References

Sources

External links
Traditional recipe on BBC website

British stews
Lancashire cuisine
Liverpool
Lamb dishes
Beef dishes